Let's Talk may refer to:
 
 Let's Talk (2002 film), an Indian English-language film
 Let's Talk (2015 film), an Italian comedy-drama
 Let's Talk (talk show), a Malaysian English-language programme
 Let's Talk (2AM album), 2014
 Let's Talk (EP), by Tyler Kyte, or the title song, 2006
 Let's Talk, an EP by Homogenic, 2012